The Division of Blair is an Australian Electoral Division in Queensland.

Geography
Since 1984, federal electoral division boundaries in Australia have been determined at redistributions by a redistribution committee appointed by the Australian Electoral Commission. Redistributions occur for the boundaries of divisions in a particular state, and they occur every seven years, or sooner if a state's representation entitlement changes or when divisions of a state are malapportioned.

History
The division was created in 1998 and is named after Harold Blair, an Aboriginal singer and civil rights campaigner. The Division is based on Ipswich, and extends from rural and exurban areas west of Brisbane to the Scenic Rim and Lockyer Valley regions.

The founder of One Nation, Pauline Hanson, contested Blair in 1998.  Her previous seat, Oxley, had been essentially split in half in the redistribution ahead of the election.  Oxley was reconfigured into an exclusively Brisbane-based seat that tilted strongly toward Labor, while most of the rural area near Ipswich shifted to Blair.  Although it was a very safe Liberal seat on paper, it contained most of Hanson's base, so it was a natural choice for Hanson to attempt to transfer.  The Liberals, Nationals and Labor preferenced each other ahead of Hanson, allowing Liberal challenger Cameron Thompson to win on the eighth count.  Thompson overtook the Labor candidate on National preferences, then defeated Hanson on Labor preferences.

Thompson held the seat without serious difficulty in the next two elections, and it was widely considered as a safe Liberal seat. In the 2006 redistribution, the 2004 Liberal margin of 11.2% was almost halved to 5.7%. Conservative-leaning Esk, Nanango and Kingaroy were transferred to Maranoa, while Blair was pushed further into Ipswich and Boonah. Blair had been rated as having received more funding promises from the Howard Government than any other electorate in the country. The redistribution pushed Blair just outside the range of seats Labor needed to win government.  In the 2007 election, Thompson was defeated by Labor challenger Shayne Neumann, with a 10.2 percent swing to Labor. Since then, the growth of Ipswich has allowed Neumann to consolidate his hold on the seat. For instance, in 2013, he actually picked up a small swing in his favour even as Labor lost government. In 2016, Neumann made Blair a safe Labor seat with 58.9 percent of the vote.

Members

Election results

References

External links
 - Division of Blair (Qld) — Australian Electoral Commission

Electoral divisions of Australia
Constituencies established in 1998
1998 establishments in Australia
Federal politics in Queensland